

UEFA Competitions

UEFA Futsal Champions League

Main Round

Path A

Group 1

Group 4

Elite round

Group C

Final tournament

Semi-finals

Final

Men's futsal

Campeonato Nacional da I Divisão

The 2018-19 season of the Campeonato Nacional da I Divisão de Futsal will be the 29th season of top-tier futsal in Portugal. It will be named Liga Sport Zone for sponsorship reasons. The regular season started on September 15, 2018, and will end in April 2019. After the end of the regular season, the top eight teams will play the championship playoffs.

Viseu 2001 and Eléctrico FC will participate for the first time in their history in the Liga Portuguesa de Futsal after being promoted from the II Divisão de Futsal.

Teams

League table

Play-off stage

Taça de Portugal

Bracket

Final

Taça da Liga

Bracket

Final

Supertaça

See also
Futsal in Portugal

References

Futsal
Portuguese Futsal First Division seasons
Portugal